The Charter School East Dulwich is a coeducational secondary school and sixth form located in the Dulwich area of the London Borough of Southwark, England.

On 9 March 2015, it was announced by the 
Department for Education that The Charter School Education Trust (the Academy Trust that runs The Charter School North Dulwich) was to enter pre-opening phase for a new school to be built on part of the site of the current Dulwich hospital. The school building, designed by Feilden Clegg Bradley Studios and constructed by The Kier Group opened to pupils in January 2019.

The Free School application was led by Manny Amadi MVO, vice-chair of governors and one of the parents who founded the original The Charter School more than 15 years previously.

The school formally opened in September 2016, and in 2022 had just under 780 pupils on its roll from Year 7 to Year 12.

References

External links
 The Charter School East Dulwich website

Free schools in London
Educational institutions established in 2016
Dulwich
Secondary schools in the London Borough of Southwark
2016 establishments in England